Michael Horace Randolph (born December 3, 1985) is an American soccer player.

Career

College and Amateur
Randolph attended Canyon Hills Junior High, where he played basketball, and Ruben S. Ayala High School. He is said to be one of the best soccer players to ever attend Ayala High School.

Randolph played for Yavapai College in Arizona, where he was named the ACCAC player of the year.  Randolph had been recruited at UCLA but did not meet academic requirements at the time.

In 2004, he helped the Roughriders to a 23–2 record and its 16th consecutive Arizona Community College Athletic Conference championship. Randolph, the 2004 ACCAC Player of the Year, helped Yavapai reach the National Semifinals but could not advance to the championship and defend the back-to-back titles the team had won in 2002 and 2003. In 2005, he finished his career at Yavapai College in Prescott Ariz., helping his team to a 24–2 record and a berth in the NJCAA National Championship. However, in the Final, the Roughriders lost 3–1 to Georgia Perimeter College, denying Yavapai of its sixth National Championship.

Professional
Randolph began his career at the Portland Timbers, where he had played 25 matches in his rookie season and been considered as one of three finalists for the USL First Division "Rookie of the Year" honor.

Randolph was signed by Los Angeles Galaxy on September 16, 2006 and made his Galaxy debut April 13, 2007 as a substitute against FC Dallas.

He was released by Galaxy in February 2009, having made 39 appearances in his two years with the team. Having been unable to secure a spot on a professional team, he signed to play with Los Angeles Legends in the USL Premier Development League for the 2009 season.

Randolph was signed by USSF Division 2 club Miami FC on March 2, 2010. After one season in Florida, Randolph returned to California when he signed with Los Angeles Blues of the USL Pro league on March 17, 2011. After six years as a professional, Randolph scored his first professional goal on April 20, 2011 in a 4–2 win over Puerto Rico United.

Personal
His younger brother Sean Randolph, who played college soccer for Wake Forest Demon Deacons from 2009 to 2011, died on December 21, 2013, in a motorcycle accident.

References

External links
 

1985 births
Living people
American soccer players
Yavapai Roughriders men's soccer players
Portland Timbers (2001–2010) players
LA Galaxy players
California Victory players
LA Laguna FC players
Miami FC (2006) players
Orange County SC players
Ventura County Fusion players
Cal FC players
Atlanta Silverbacks players
Association football fullbacks
USL First Division players
Major League Soccer players
USL League Two players
USSF Division 2 Professional League players
USL Championship players
North American Soccer League players
People from Chino Hills, California
United States men's under-23 international soccer players
Ottawa Fury FC players